CK Nayudu trophy is a domestic cricket tournament of India. It is organised by Board of Control for Cricket in India. It is an under 25 tournament. It was named after India's first Test cricket captain CK Nayudu. 

It is a four-day tournament, in which state teams of India takes part. Mumbai cricket team (U 25) is the current champion, who won against Vidarbha in 2022 final.

History 

In 2007's CK Nayudu trophy final at Vishakhapatnam, Mumbai cricket team won versus Maharashtra cricket team and became champion. In 2016, Mumbai U-23 won this tournament. In 2017 Delhi U- 23 team defeated Mumbai in the final and became winner. In 2021, the tournament was postponed due to COVID-19 pandemic. BCCI secretary Jay Shah, informed state association about 2022 CK Nayudu trophy, which per Times of India, reported to initiate from March, 17. In 2022 season, Mumbai defeated Vidarbha in the final and became winner.

References 

Indian domestic cricket competitions